Piotr Paweł Wiwczarek (born 22 October 1965 in Olsztyn, Poland), also known as Peter, (ex nickname  Behemoth) is a Polish musician who is the vocalist and lead guitarist for the death metal band Vader, as the only constant member of the band since its inception. He has also collaborated with Kazimierz "Para" Paraszczuk on his tribute album, Bandid Rockin', and is the producer of several of Vader's releases. He is also the founder and guitarist of a side-project, named Panzer X.

Wiwczarek also became a producer for the first time in 1999, when producing the Polish death metal band Decapitated's first release, Winds of Creation.

Gear 
 4x Ran Invader, 6 string (EMG 81 Pickup)
 Ran Invader, 6 string (EMG X Pickup)
 Laboga Mr. Hector Amplifier
 Laboga 412 V30 Cabinets
 Mesa Boogie Dual Rectifier Solo Head
Morley Bad Horsie II
Boss NS-1
POD XT Live
Mipro ACT 707s
Ernie Ball Strings (.010"-.052")

Discography

Slashing Death – Live at Thrash Camp (1988, guest vocals)
Impurity – In Pain We Trust (1990, guest bass guitar)
Para Wino Band – Bandid Rockin (1993, guest vocals)
Kingdom of the Lie – About the Rising Star (1993, guest guitar)
Proletaryat – Live 93 (1994, guest guitar)
Misya – Misya (1994, guest vocals) 
Sweet Noise – Getto (1996, guest vocals)
Decapitated – Winds of Creation (2000, producer)
Ceti – Shadow of the Angel (2003, guest vocals) 
Panzer X – Steel Fist (2004, guitar, vocals)
Crionics – N.O.I.R. (2010, guest vocals) 
 VA - Mazurski cud (2011, single) 
Crystal Viper – Crimen Excepta (2012, guest vocals)
 Sabaton – 40:1 (2013, single, guest vocals)

Filmography
 Historia polskiego rocka  (2008, documentary, directed: Leszek Gnoiński, Wojciech Słota)

References

1965 births
20th-century Polish male singers
21st-century Polish male singers
21st-century Polish singers
English-language singers from Poland
Lead guitarists
Living people
Death metal musicians
Polish heavy metal guitarists
Polish heavy metal singers
Polish lyricists
Vader (band) members
Polish male guitarists